Pseudocatharylla is a genus of moths of the family Crambidae.

Species
Pseudocatharylla albiceps (Hampson, 1912)
Pseudocatharylla allecto Bassi, 1999
Pseudocatharylla angolica Bleszynski, 1964
Pseudocatharylla argenticilia (Hampson, 1919)
Pseudocatharylla artemida Bleszynski, 1964
Pseudocatharylla asteria Bassi, 1999
Pseudocatharylla auricinctalis (Walker, 1863)
Pseudocatharylla aurifimbriellus (Hampson, 1896)
Pseudocatharylla berberichi Bleszynski, 1970
Pseudocatharylla calypso Bassi, 1999
Pseudocatharylla chalcipterus (Hampson, 1896)
Pseudocatharylla chionopepla (Hampson, 1919)
Pseudocatharylla duplicellus (Hampson, 1896)
Pseudocatharylla faduguella Schouten, 1994
Pseudocatharylla flavicostella Bleszynski, 1964
Pseudocatharylla flavipedellus (Zeller, 1852)
Pseudocatharylla gioconda Bleszynski, 1964
Pseudocatharylla inclaralis (Walker, 1863)
Pseudocatharylla infixellus (Walker, 1863)
Pseudocatharylla innotalis (Hampson, 1919)
Pseudocatharylla kibwezica Bleszynski, 1964
Pseudocatharylla lagosella Bleszynski, 1964
Pseudocatharylla latiola Chen, Song & Yuan, 2002
Pseudocatharylla mariposella Bleszynski, 1964
Pseudocatharylla megera Bassi, 1999
Pseudocatharylla meus (Strand, 1918)
Pseudocatharylla mikengella Bleszynski, 1964
Pseudocatharylla nemesis Bleszynski, 1964
Pseudocatharylla nigrociliella (Zeller, 1863)
Pseudocatharylla peralbellus (Hampson, 1919)
Pseudocatharylla photoleuca (Lower, 1903)
Pseudocatharylla polyxena Bleszynski, 1964
Pseudocatharylla ruwenzorella Bleszynski, 1964
Pseudocatharylla shafferi Bassi, 1999
Pseudocatharylla simplex (Zeller, 1877)
Pseudocatharylla subgioconda Bleszynski, 1964
Pseudocatharylla submikengella Bleszynski, 1964
Pseudocatharylla tisiphone Bassi, 1999
Pseudocatharylla ugandica Bleszynski, 1964
Pseudocatharylla xymena Bleszynski, 1964
Pseudocatharylla zernyi Bleszynski, 1964

References

Natural History Museum Lepidoptera genus database

Crambinae
Crambidae genera
Taxa named by Stanisław Błeszyński